Gregory Hickey (born March 8, 1955) is a Canadian retired professional ice hockey player. Hickey played in one National Hockey League game for the New York Rangers during the 1977–78 NHL season. Hickey was born in Brantford, Ontario. He is the brother of Pat Hickey.

Career statistics

See also
List of players who played only one game in the NHL

External links

1955 births
Canadian ice hockey left wingers
Charlotte Checkers (SHL) players
Fort Wayne Komets players
Hamilton Red Wings (OHA) players
Living people
Minnesota Fighting Saints draft picks
New Haven Nighthawks players
New York Rangers draft picks
New York Rangers players
Providence Reds players
Richmond Wildcats players
Ice hockey people from Toronto
Springfield Indians players